Ola Hudson (née Oliver; October 12, 1946 – June 5, 2009) was an American fashion designer and costumier. She designed costumes for several famous musicians, including the Pointer Sisters, Diana Ross, Janet Jackson, David Bowie, John Lennon and Ringo Starr. She is the mother of Saul Hudson, known professionally as  Slash, of Guns N' Roses. Her designs are in the permanent collection of the Metropolitan Museum of Art.

Biography 
Hudson was born Ola Oliver in Los Angeles, California, on October 12, 1946. As a young adult, she studied at the Lester Horton School of Modern Dance. She also studied with dancers Bella Lewitzsky and Linda Gold. She then went to study at the Institute of Dance in Paris, at Le Loft in Switzerland and the Max Rivers School in London.

In London, she met and married Anthony Hudson. In 1965, she gave birth to Saul Hudson (Slash from Guns N' Roses) in her husband's native United Kingdom. Her marriage to Anthony was troubled and she returned to Los Angeles, working out of Hollywood. In 1972, she gave birth to Albion. Her family met back up with her in Los Angeles around 1975. When Hudson worked with David Bowie in the mid-1970s, the relationship started out professional, but later they became lovers for a time.

Hudson died on June 5, 2009, of cancer.

Career 
Hudson's design company was named Ola Hudson Enterprises, Incorporated. Hudson also created special collections for Arpeja, Henri Bendel, Right Bank Clothing and Neiman Marcus in Beverly Hills, Maxfield Blu of Los Angeles. Hudson's fashion design was somewhat minimal. She said, "It's getting right down to basics". She was also known for her retro design work, featuring details from the 1940s, that the Pointer Sisters wore. Hudson's designs were featured at a 1974 show, Los Angeles Space-Age Designs: Past-Present-Future. Hudson also designed clothing for dancer Linda Gold.

Hudson designed clothing for The Man Who Fell to Earth and for Station to Station. She also created the black pants and waistcoat for David Bowie's Thin White Duke look in 1976. Some of the items she designed for Bowie are part of the permanent collection at the Metropolitan Museum of Modern Art.

References

External links 
 Dewar's ad

1946 births
2009 deaths
African-American fashion designers
American fashion designers
American costume designers
American expatriates in England
Deaths from cancer
People from Los Angeles
20th-century African-American people
21st-century African-American people